Amoes Do (born 4 September 1994) is an Indian professional footballer who plays as a midfielder for South United in the Bangalore Super Division.

Career

Early career
Born in the Murphy Town area of Bangalore, Karnataka, Amoes had represented Karnataka at youth level before joining South United F.C. in the Bangalore Super Division and then the I-League 2nd Division. In July 2013 it was revealed by South United coach, Raman Vijayan, that Amoes had attended a trial at I-League club Pune F.C. for the upcoming season.

Bengaluru FC
On 11 September 2013 it was announced that Amoes, along with Niroshan Mani, had signed for Bengaluru FC for the 2013–14 I-League season. He then made his professional debut for the side on 2 November 2013 against Mumbai F.C. at the Balewadi Sports Complex in which he came on in the 87th minute for Sunil Chhetri as Bengaluru drew the match 2–2.

Mumbai
In December 2014, Amoes signed for Mumbai F.C.

Career statistics

Honours

India U23
 South Asian Games Silver medal: 2016

References

External links 
 AIFF Profile
 I-League Profile

1994 births
Living people
Footballers from Bangalore
Indian footballers
India youth international footballers
South United FC players
Bengaluru FC players
Mumbai FC players
Association football midfielders
I-League players
Indian Super League players
Odisha FC players
Chennai City FC players
FC Bengaluru United players
South Asian Games silver medalists for India
South Asian Games medalists in football